Vlad Gheorghe (born on 22 February 1985), is a Romanian politician who is currently a member of the European Parliament.

Biography

Vlad Gheorghe was born in Bucharest on 22 February 1985.

Gheorghe is a lawyer specializing in administrative-fiscal law, European funds and public procurement. He has worked for over 8 years in NGOs and private companies running projects with European funds on infrastructure, environment and human resources. He came to public attention after being beaten by gendarmes on 10 August 2018 at the anti-government rally in Victoriei Square in Bucharest. He was one of the vocal protesters who demanded that the violence of the last two years be investigated by prosecutors.

In the 2019 elections, he ran for the European Parliament on the recommendation of the USR. He took over as a Member of Parliament in his ninth term on 10 November 2020, replacing Clotilde Armand after she resigned in order to take up her term as mayor of Sector 1.

References

1985 births
Living people
MEPs for Romania 2019–2024